Alchemik (film) is a Polish horror film written and directed by Jacek Koprowicz. It was released in 1988.

Plot

An alchemist Sendivius, arrives at king Fryderyk's court, and claims that he possesses a recipe for the transmutation of base metals into gold. He claims that the transmutation emits poisonous gasses, and asks everybody to leave the room. After some time Sendivus arrives with gold, which he falsely claims to be the result of transmutation. As a reward, he asks the king to release an imprisoned alchemist Tomasz Seton, who is in the possession of a real transmutation recipe. Seton is freed, however, he is already in agony and can't tell anything of value to Sendivus. The only hope of Sendivus is finding the wife of Seton, a satanist Teresa Seton, who might be in the possession of the recipe.

Cast
 Olgierd Łukaszewicz as Sendivius
 Michał Bajor as Prince Fryderyk
 Joanna Szczepkowska as Teresa Seton
 Marek Obertyn as Von Rumpf
 Michal Pawlicki as Von Lotz
 Jerzy Nowak as Prince Kiejstut
 Henryk Machalica as Vasari
 Leon Niemczyk as Zwinger
 Mariusz Dmochowski as Master Melchior
Dariusz Tomaszewski as Conaro
Katarzyna Gałaj as Maria

References

External links
 

1988 films
1988 horror films
1988 fantasy films
Polish fantasy films
Polish horror films
Fiction about alchemy
Films about Satanism
1980s Polish-language films